Lewiston Woodville is a town in Bertie County, North Carolina, United States. The population was 549 at the 2010 census. It is the location of Perdue Farms, one of the largest chicken-producing companies in North Carolina.

History
Lewiston was named for an early settler. Lewiston and Woodville were formerly separate towns.

The St. Frances Methodist Church, Woodville Historic District, and William H. Lee House are listed on the National Register of Historic Places.

Geography
Lewiston Woodville is located at  (36.118944, -77.182245).

Demographics

As of the census of 2000, there were 613 people, 239 households, and 152 families residing in the town. The population density was 310.7 people per square mile (120.1/km2). There were 283 housing units at an average density of 143.5 per square mile (55.5/km2). The racial makeup of the town was 32.46% White, 66.72% African American, 0.16% Native American, 0.16% Asian, 0.16% from other races, and 0.33% from two or more races. Hispanic or Latino of any race were 1.14% of the population.

There were 239 households, out of which 31.0% had children under the age of 18 living with them, 39.3% were married couples living together, 21.3% had a female householder with no husband present, and 36.0% were non-families. 31.8% of all households were made up of individuals, and 15.1% had someone living alone who was 65 years of age or older. The average household size was 2.56 and the average family size was 3.27.

In the town, the population was spread out, with 30.0% under the age of 18, 8.3% from 18 to 24, 24.5% from 25 to 44, 23.5% from 45 to 64, and 13.7% who were 65 years of age or older. The median age was 37 years. For every 100 females, there were 82.4 males. For every 100 females age 18 and over, there were 77.3 males.

The median income for a household in the town was $20,875, and the median income for a family was $26,389. Males had a median income of $26,354 versus $17,292 for females. The per capita income for the town was $12,911. About 28.2% of families and 31.5% of the population were below the poverty line, including 48.2% of those under age 18 and 17.7% of those age 65 or over.

See also
 Woodville, North Carolina

References

Towns in Bertie County, North Carolina
Towns in North Carolina